La Chapelle-Saint-Sauveur is a commune in the Saône-et-Loire department in the region of Bourgogne-Franche-Comté in eastern France. The commune is located in the canton of Pierre-de-Bresse and the arrondissement of Louhans.

See also
Communes of the Saône-et-Loire department

References

Communes of Saône-et-Loire